Susanne Stephanie Kasperczyk (born 1 August 1985) is a German football defender, currently playing for Bayer Leverkusen in the Bundesliga. She has also played for Brauweiler Pulheim, SG Essen-Schönebeck and 1. FC Köln.

As an Under-19 international she played the 2002 U-19 World Championship and the 2002 and 2004 U-19 European Championships, winning the 2002 Euro.

References

1985 births
Living people
German women's footballers
Women's association football forwards
People from Eschweiler
Sportspeople from Cologne (region)
Footballers from North Rhine-Westphalia